Alar Varrak (born 20 April 1982) is an Estonian basketball coach and a former point guard. He is the assistant coach of Kalev/Cramo  of in the VTB United League.

Career
Varrak was born in Jõgeva, and spent his short playing career in the Estonian League. In 2008 he became the assistant coach of Kalev/Cramo and succeeded Aivar Kuusmaa as the head coach on 24 November 2012. Varrak was fired from Kalev/Cramo in November 2017. In January 2018 he became the head coach of Lithuanian League team Dzūkija Alytus. He left due to health reasons in April. In July 2018 he was elected as the sporting director of the Estonian Basketball Association. He resigned from the sporting director position in July 2019 and signed with Russian Basketball Super League 1 team Ural Yekaterinburg. He was fired from the team in November 2019 due to poor results.

Achievements with club

As player
Tallinna Kalev
Korvpalli Meistriliiga (1): 2001–02
Estonian Basketball Cup (1): 2001

As coach
Noortekoondis/Audentes
 I Liiga (1): 2007

Kalev/Cramo
Korvpalli Meistriliiga (7): 2008–09, 2010–11, 2011–12, 2012–13, 2013–14, 2015–16, 2016–17
Estonian Basketball Cup (4): 2008, 2015, 2016, 2020

Season by season results as head coach
Abbreviations:SF; semi finals.T16; top sixteen.RS; regular season (group stage).QR2; qualification round 2.DNP; did not participate.

See also
Estonia national basketball team
Estonian League
Kalev/Cramo

References

1982 births
Living people
BC Kalev/Cramo players
Estonian basketball coaches
Estonian men's basketball players
Point guards
Sportspeople from Jõgeva